Ayem is a small town in central western Gabon. It is situated in Mvoung Department, Ogooué-Ivindo Province. The town is near the Equator, which lies just 5.5 miles to the south.

Transport 
It has a small station on the Trans-Gabon Railway.

See also 
 Transport in Gabon

References 

Populated places in Ogooué-Ivindo Province